Griffith University is a public research university in South East Queensland on the east coast of Australia. Formally founded in 1971, Griffith opened its doors in 1975, introducing Australia's first degrees in environmental science and Asian studies.

The university is named after Sir Samuel Walker Griffith, who was twice Premier of Queensland and the first Chief Justice of the High Court of Australia. Sir Samuel Griffith played a major role in the Federation of Australia and was the principal author of the Australian constitution.

Opening at Nathan as a single campus of 451 students, the University now has five campuses spanning three cities, the largest of which are the Gold Coast campus at Southport and the Nathan campus in Brisbane. The Mount Gravatt and South Bank campuses are also located in Brisbane, while the Logan campus is at Meadowbrook.

Griffith has about 50,000 students and offers a full suite of undergraduate, postgraduate and research degrees in the areas of business and government, criminology and law, education, engineering and information technology, environment, planning and architecture, health, humanities and languages, music, science and aviation, and visual and creative arts. It is a verdant university and a member of the IRU.

In the 2021 Student Experience Survey, Griffith University recorded the ninth-highest student satisfaction rating out of all Australian universities, and the third-highest student satisfaction rating out of all public Queensland universities, with an overall satisfaction rating of 77.2. Since 2012, Griffith University has received more Australian Awards for University Teaching than any other Australian university. Griffith has many distinguished alumni and academic staff, including 2017 Australian of the Year Emeritus Professor Alan Mackay-Sim and 2021 Queensland Australian of the Year Dinesh Palipana.

History

Beginnings
In 1965,  of natural bushland at Nathan were set aside for a new university campus. Initially, the site was to be part of the University of Queensland, which was experiencing strong demand in humanities and social sciences. By 1970, a new tertiary institution was being mooted, and Theodor Bray (later Sir Theodor Bray) was asked by the Queensland Government to establish a second for Brisbane and the third for the state. After several months of discussion, the government announced on 24 December 1970 that Bray would head a committee charged with establishing Griffith University. 

On 30 September 1971, the Queensland Government officially created and recognised Griffith University with the passing of the Assent to Griffith University Act 1971. On 5 March 1975, Griffith University began teaching 451 students in four schools: Australian Environmental Studies, Humanities, Modern Asian Studies and Science. The university was distinguished by its "problem-based", rather than disciplinary, approach to course design and research.

Expansion
In the 1990s, the Dawkins Revolution saw a number of tertiary education reforms in Australia, resulting in a series of amalgamations of colleges and universities. In 1990, the Mount Gravatt Teacher's College (est. 1969) and Gold Coast College of Advanced Education (est. 1987) became official campuses of Griffith University, remaining in the same location today.  The Queensland Conservatorium of Music continued the higher education mergers and became an official part of Griffith University in 1991. Originally established in 1957, the new entity became known as Queensland Conservatorium Griffith University. In 1992, Griffith's amalgamations were completed with the Queensland College of Art (QCA), established in 1881 and recognised as the oldest continuous operating art training institution in Australia, officially becoming part of the university.

Griffith's fifth campus, Logan, opened in 1998. Located in the suburb of Meadowbrook, on an area of green fields south of Brisbane, the Logan campus was established to specifically address the interests and needs of the Logan City area.

Griffith University was an official Partner of the Gold Coast 2018 Commonwealth Games. Over 500 students and staff were closely involved in the planning and delivery of event.

Campuses
Griffith University's campuses are distinctive for their nature-based settings within urban environments.

Gold Coast campus
The Gold Coast campus is located in the Gold Coast suburb of Southport. Set in native bushland, on the land of the Aboriginal Yugambeh and Kombumerri peoples, this campus hosts over 19,000 students from all over Australia and the world. It is Griffith University's largest campus.

The campus has seen significant growth and development over the last few years, with the opening of the $150 million Griffith Health Centre and the neighbouring Gold Coast University Hospital in 2013, and the launch of the $38 million Griffith Business School building in 2014. The campus is serviced by two Gold Coast light rail (G:link) stations, and is a major interchange for bus routes.

Logan campus
Logan is Griffith University's community-focused campus. Hosting almost 2500 students, the campus offers degrees in human services and social work, nursing and midwifery, business and commerce, education and information technology. The campus has strong connections with the local community, hosting numerous sporting and cultural events throughout the year.

Nathan campus
Nathan, Griffith's foundation campus, is situated in tranquil, native bushland on the edge of Toohey Forest and less than 10 kilometres from the Brisbane CBD. Nathan hosts over 13,000 students and offers degrees in business and government, engineering and information technology, environment, humanities and languages, law, and science and aviation.

The buildings at the Nathan campus were designed to fit into the environment by Roger Kirk Johnson, the founding architectural designer of the campus, following the slope of the land and using architectural means of cooling. The library building was designed by Robin Gibson and won the first national award for library design. The clusters of buildings, sports facilities, bushland reserves and recreational areas are connected by integrated networks of walking paths. On the northern edge of the campus lies the Dunn Memorial.

In 2013, the six-star, green-rated Sir Samuel Griffith Centre was opened on the Nathan campus. The building operates off the grid and is powered by a combination of photovoltaics and hydrogen.

The campus has two residential colleges for students and a range of sporting facilities.

Mount Gravatt campus

The Mount Gravatt campus, adjacent to the Nathan campus, hosts 4,400 students. It is the university's social sciences and humanities hub and the base for research into crucial social issues, including education and suicide prevention.

Like Nathan, the campus is situated on the edge of Toohey Forest. The campus features a recently upgraded aquatic and fitness centre, with a heated pool and indoor and outdoor recreation areas, co-located with a 16-court tennis centre, a training oval, and basketball and netball courts. On-campus student accommodation is also available.

South Bank campus
Located in Brisbane's cultural precinct, the South Bank campus is Griffith University's creative hub. It encompasses Griffith's Queensland College of Art and Queensland Conservatorium, and the Griffith Film School and Griffith Graduate Centre. , enrolment for all four units is about 3400 students.

Organisation 
Griffith University is structured in four academic groups, with teaching offered through a range of schools, colleges and departments.

Arts, Education and Law 
 School of Criminology and Criminal Justice
 School of Education and Professional Studies
 School of Humanities, Languages and Social Science
 Griffith Law School
 Queensland College of Art
 Griffith Film School
 Queensland Conservatorium

Griffith Business School 
 Department of Accounting, Finance and Economics
 Department of Employment Relations and Human Resources
 Department of Business Strategy and Innovation
 Department of Marketing
 Department of Tourism, Sport and Hotel Management
 School of Government and International Relations

Griffith Health 
 School of Applied Psychology
 School of Health Sciences and Social Work
 School of Medicine and Dentistry
 School of Nursing and Midwifery
 School of Pharmacy and Medical Sciences

Griffith Sciences 
 School of Engineering and Built Environment
 School of Environment and Science
 School of Information and Communication Technology

Academic profile

Rankings

In Australia, Griffith University ranks 18th out of 37 universities. Griffith is in the top 300 universities worldwide in four major world rankings; Academic Ranking of World Universities (ARWU), QS World University Rankings (QS), Times Higher Education World University Rankings (THE-WUR), and University Rankings by Academic Performance (URAP).

Griffith also ranks highly as a young university, ranking 33rd in the 2021 QS University Rankings Top 50 Under 50 and 33rd in the 2022 Times Higher Education Young University Rankings.

Griffith has several top ranking subjects according to the ShanghaiRanking Global Ranking of Academic Subjects 2022:

Top 10
 Hospitality and Tourism Management (third globally, first in Australia)
 Nursing and Midwifery (second globally, first in Australia) 

Top 40-100
Computer Science and Engineering
Dentistry and Oral Sciences (second in Australia)
Education
Energy Science and Engineering
Law (first in Australia)
Marine/Ocean Engineering (third in Australia)
Water Resources

Top 101-150
Chemical Engineering
Civil Engineering
Environmental Science and Engineering
Geography
Materials Science and Engineering
Nanoscience and Nanotechnology 
Public Administration

According to Excellence in Research for Australia (2018), Griffith was rated ‘well above world standard’ in 24 fields of research, including chemical sciences, dentistry, political science and technology.

MBA 
The Griffith MBA is ranked among Australia's leading MBA programs in CEO Magazine and its 2022 MBA Rankings. The rankings are compiled by the International Graduate Forum and are designed to present a 360-degree view of the world's leading business schools. The Griffith MBA is placed fourth in the top tier of Australian programs. It also features in the magazine's top 20 Global MBA Rankings.

The MBA is also the highest-ranking Australian MBA in the Aspen Institute's Centre for Business Education's most recent Beyond Grey Pinstripes Global Top 100, ranked at number 26. Griffith University was awarded this ranking for its focus on responsible leadership, sustainable business practices and the Asia-Pacific. It was also acknowledged as one of Australia's best, ranking fifth in Australia in the 2019 Financial Review BOSS Magazine MBA Survey.

Teaching awards 
Griffith features prominently in Australia's national teaching awards and citations. Since 2012, Griffith has won 10 awards for Teaching Excellence, 7 awards for Programs that Enhance Learning, 46 Citations for Outstanding Contributions to Student Learning and 7 National Teaching Fellowships. Three Griffith staff have been named the Prime Minister's Australian Teacher of the Year.

Research
Griffith researchers work in 38 centres and institutes, investigating areas such as water science, climate change adaptation, criminology and crime prevention, sustainable tourism and health and chronic disease. 
 
The university's major research institutes include: 
Advanced Design and Prototyping Technologies Institute (ADaPT)
Australian Rivers Institute
Cities Research Institute
Environmental Futures Research Institute
Griffith Asia Institute
Griffith Criminology Institute
 Griffith Institute for Educational Research
 Griffith Institute for Tourism
 Institute for Glycomics
Institute for Integrated and Intelligent Systems
 Menzies Health Institute Queensland (formerly the Griffith Health Institute)
 Griffith Institute for Drug Discovery (GRIDD)

Additionally, Griffith hosts several externally supported centres and facilities, including:
 Australian Institute for Suicide Research and Prevention
National Climate Change Adaptation Research Facility
 Smart Water Research Centre
 NHMRC Centre of Research Excellence in Nursing

Research commercialisation 
Griffith offers research commercialisation and services for business, industry and government through Griffith Enterprise.

Other centres 
As well as research centres and institutes, Griffith has a number of cultural and community focused organisations. These include the EcoCentre, which provides a space for environmental education activities, exhibitions, seminars and workshops; and the Centre for Interfaith & Cultural Dialogue (formerly the Multi-Faith Centre).

Recognised research

In 2021, a research team led by the University discovered a new type of tree frog in New Guinea which is commonly known as the "chocolate frog".

Student life

Student organisations
Griffith University has a wide array of cultural, intellectual, sporting and social groups. Its Student Guild takes care of these clubs on the Gold Coast campus, as well as student issues, accommodation, employment, publication, events, sport and recreation. On the Nathan campus, Campus Life supports many clubs including the long running GRUBS (Griffith University Bushwalking Club), the Karate and Kickboxing club and the Griffith University Aikido Club.

Uniquely, Griffith University students are represented by two statutory embedded student organisations. The Griffith University Student Representative Council (GUSRC) represents undergraduate students and the Griffith University Postgraduate Students Association (GUPSA) represents post-graduate students in all campuses apart from the Gold Coast. GUPSA is a constituent member of the Council of Australian Postgraduate Associations. Unique to the Gold Coast is the Student Guild (GUSG), which represents all students from this campus and has an administrative structure that is apparently independent to the university.

Griffith Honours College 
The Griffith Honours College offers high-achieving students potential opportunities to enrich their university experience through mentoring, international experiences, leadership roles and community engagement activities.

Griffith Sports College 
Students who are elite athletes are eligible to join the Griffith Sports College, which provides support by helping them balance sporting and university commitments. Griffith University formally fielded soccer teams within Football Gold Coast competitions.

GUMURRII Student Support Unit 
The GUMURRII Student Support Unit (SSU) is the heart of Griffith's Aboriginal and Torres Strait Islander community and is located on each of Griffith's five campuses.

GUMURRII is a dedicated Student Support Unit for Aboriginal and Torres Strait Islander students. Aboriginal and Torres Strait Islander staff assist students from recruitment, to orientation providing undergraduate and postgraduate support through to graduation to afar.

Griffith College 
Located on Griffith University's Mount Gravatt and Gold Coast campuses, Griffith College, formerly the Queensland Institute of Business and Technology, offers undergraduate diplomas in a range of areas, which provide a pathway into many of Griffith's degree programs.

Griffith English Language Institute 
Students from non-English-speaking backgrounds can study English at the Griffith English Language Institute (GELI). A wide range of English language courses are available to help students improve their English for work, travel, study or everyday purposes.

Residential colleges

Griffith University has four residential colleges, with two located on its Nathan campus and one each on its Mt Gravatt and Gold Coast campuses. The three colleges located in Brisbane compete in the sporting Inter-College Cup, also known as the ICC. The premier event of the ICC is the Phar Cup, where both female and male teams compete in rugby league matches against each other. The colleges are as follows:

 Bellenden Ker College, a.k.a. BK, is a co-educational college located on the Nathan Campus in the Toohey forest reserve.
 KGBC, also known as "The Flats", consist of four co-educational undergraduate and postgraduate apartments on the Nathan Campus.
  Mt Gravatt College, a.k.a. MG, is a co-educational college located on the Mt Gravatt Campus which itself sits on the hill for which the surrounding suburbs are named.
 Griffith University Village is a collection of co-ed apartments on the Gold Coast Campus.

Safe Campuses initiative
Between 2011 and 2016, there were 46 officially reported cases of sexual abuse and harassment on campus released by the University, resulting in no expulsions and one six-month suspension, the highest reported stats in Queensland at the time. This was fewer than the 2017 Australian Human Rights Commission report on sexual assault and harassment, which found reported figures higher than this.

Following the release of the report, Griffith University established the Safe Campuses Taskforce. The Taskforce and its working parties are working to ensure Griffith's campuses provide safe, inclusive and respectful environments for all students and staff.

Alumni 

Griffith has over 200,000 alumni. Notable graduates have been journalists, musicians, actors, artists, filmmakers, photographers, athletes, activists and politicians in the Parliament of Australia and the Parliament of Queensland.

See also

List of universities in Australia

References

External links

 Australian university rankings
 Griffith University website
 Griffith University Village
 Griffith University Online

 
1971 establishments in Australia
APRA Award winners
Universities in Brisbane
Educational institutions established in 1971
Education on the Gold Coast, Queensland
Universities in Queensland
Schools in Queensland